The 1977 Texas Longhorns football team represented the University of Texas at Austin in the 1977 NCAA Division I football season.  The Longhorns finished the regular season with an 11–0 record. Earl Campbell won the Heisman Trophy in 1977 and led the nation in rushing with 1,744 yards. In 1977, he became the first recipient of the Davey O'Brien Memorial Trophy, which was awarded to the most outstanding player in the now-defunct Southwest Conference.  He was selected as the Southwest Conference running back of the year in each of his college seasons and finished with 4,444 career rushing yards. Rothman (FACT), a mathematical rating system in use since 1968 and NCAA-designated major selector, selected Texas as co-national champions with Notre Dame and Arkansas.

Schedule

Roster

Game summaries

Oklahoma

at Arkansas

at Texas A&M

    
    
    
    
    
    
    
    
    
    
    
    
    

Earl Campbell 27 Rush, 222 Yds (career-high)

Notre Dame (Cotton Bowl)

Rankings

Awards and honors
Earl Campbell – Heisman Trophy, Davey O'Brien Memorial Trophy, Consensus All-American
Brad Shearer – Outland Trophy, Consensus All-American
Fred Akers – SWC Coach of the Year

1977 team players in the NFL
The following players were drafted into professional football following the season.

References

Texas
Texas Longhorns football seasons
Southwest Conference football champion seasons
Texas Longhorns football